Noah is the debut studio album from American Tenor Noah Stewart. It was released in the United Kingdom on March 26, 2012.

Reception

Critical reception
The album has so far been well received by critics. Simon Gage of The Daily Express gave the album a positive review stating, "This album couldn’t be a better showcase, mixing classic tracks with contemporary material such as Sting’s "Fields Of Gold" and Leonard Cohen’s "Hallelujah". The voice is flawless and the production pure class while the man himself is something of a major dish into the bargain."

Commercial performance
The album entered the UK Albums Chart at number 14 on April 1, 2012. It was the second highest new entry that week. He also became the first black artist to top the UK classical album chart. Official Charts Company managing director Martin Talbot says, "This is a truly groundbreaking achievement for Noah Stewart.  Most people naturally look to the Singles and Albums charts for the emergence of new talent, but Noah is sure to become a familiar name for years to come following this landmark breakthrough."

Track listing

Chart performance

Release history

References

External links
 Official website
 Noah Stewart on Twitter
 Noah Stewart on Facebook

2012 debut albums
Noah Stewart albums